Shirabad (also Romanized as Shīrābād) is a village in Zavarom Rural District, in the Central District of Shirvan County, North Khorasan Province, Iran. At the 2006 census, its population was 58, in 17 families.

References 

Populated places in Shirvan County